Yoon Jong-Hwan (born 16 February 1973 in Gwangju, South Korea) is a South Korean manager and former football player.

Club career 
In Korea, Yoon started his professional football career at Yukong Elephants and played at Bucheon SK and Jeonbuk Hyundai Motors for two seasons (2004–2005 : 13 goals, 4 assists).
He played most notably for Cerezo Osaka in Japan. His last club was Sagan Tosu in Japan.

After the 2007 J2 League season, he announced his retirement from professional football as a player.

International career 
He was the member of South Korea U-23 in 1996 Atlanta Olympic.

He also played for the South Korea national football team and was a participant at the 2002 FIFA World Cup. Yoon did not play in any of the seven games.

Club statistics

National team statistics

International goals
Results list South Korea's goal tally first.

Managerial statistics

Honours

Player
Seongnam Ilhwa Chunma
 K League 1 (1): 2003

Jeonbuk Hyundai Motors
 Korean FA Cup (1): 2005

Manager
Cerezo Osaka
 J.League Cup (1): 2017
 Emperor's Cup (1): 2017
 Japanese Super Cup (1): 2018

Individual
 J.League Manager of the Year (1): 2017

References

External links
 
 
 
 
 
 

1973 births
Living people
Association football midfielders
South Korean footballers
South Korean expatriate footballers
South Korea international footballers
Jeju United FC players
Cerezo Osaka players
Seongnam FC players
Jeonbuk Hyundai Motors players
Sagan Tosu players
K League 1 players
J1 League players
J2 League players
J1 League managers
J2 League managers
Sagan Tosu managers
Ulsan Hyundai FC managers
Cerezo Osaka managers
JEF United Chiba managers
2000 AFC Asian Cup players
2000 CONCACAF Gold Cup players
2001 FIFA Confederations Cup players
2002 FIFA World Cup players
Footballers at the 1996 Summer Olympics
Olympic footballers of South Korea
Expatriate footballers in Japan
South Korean expatriate sportspeople in Japan
Sportspeople from Gwangju
Footballers at the 1998 Asian Games
Asian Games competitors for South Korea
South Korean football managers